The NewDEAL is an American Democratic Party-affiliated political organization founded in 2011 by honorary co-chairs Governor Martin O'Malley of Maryland and U.S. Senator Mark Begich of Alaska to promote "pro-growth progressive state and local elected leaders and their innovative ideas from across the country." DEAL is an acronym for "Developing Exceptional American Leaders."

Steve Benen of Washington Monthly described the network as an attempt to create "a farm team" for Democrats to identify "future stars."

References

External links
NewDEAL Leaders website

Democratic Party (United States) organizations
Organizations established in 2011